Live Apocalypse is a double DVD by Arch Enemy, released in 2006. It's the band's first DVD release and contains a full concert and several extras. It was released on 24 July in Europe, 26 July in Japan, and 8 August in the US.

The London Forum concert was actually the last with Christopher Amott before his departure the following year, but he later rejoined the band in 2007.

Content

Disc one

Disc two

Reception

Critical response

Live Apocalypse was acclaimed by critics. Justin Donnelly of Blistering praised the DVD describing it like "an extremely well-produced DVD set that presents Arch Enemy at its best in the live forum, as well as offering hardcore followers a little extra" and complete stating that the record "is first-class all the way." Chad Bowar of About.com praised the audio and video quality of the live footage calling it of "excellent." He also added that the record "has great live performances." Ralph of Lords of Metal praised Andy Sneap saying that he "did a good job making it sound perfect." He commented that "there's not much to say about this DVD other than that it is great... First class material, first class band!" Scott Alisoglu of Blabbermouth.net commented that "the 18-song performance stimulates the eyes and ears to the nth degree" and called the sound mix of "phenomenal". He praised the band, but noted that "it is the guitar work of Mike and Christopher Amott that really shines" on the record.

Tony Antunovich of Metal Eater praised the production stating "anything Sneap touches turns to gold." Antunovich commented that "right from the get-go, it's obvious that this is not your typical live DVD. There is absolutely no muffled sound, no piercing amp malfunctions, and you're not going be bored to tears watching one consistent shot of the band performing on stage... The filming techniques are just amazing." He finishes stating that "if there ever was a music DVD that sets the standard for all others to follow, it's this one" and that "truly is one of the best Metal DVDs ever produced." Not unlike him, journalist Jon Eardley of Metal Review ranked Live Apocalypse as one of best metal DVDs along Lamb of God's Killadelphia, Dream Theater's Metropolis 2000 and Opeth's Lamentations.

Accolades
Live Apocalypse won DVD of the Year at the 2006 Burrn! Magazine Awards.

Personnel

Arch Enemy
 Angela Gossow − vocals
 Michael Amott − guitars
 Christopher Amott − guitars
 Sharlee D'Angelo − bass
 Daniel Erlandsson − drums

Production
 Martin R. Smith − concert producer, director 
 Paul Smith − DVD authoring, editing, producer
 Andy Sneap − mixing
 Fredrik Åkesson − guitars at Manchester Academy show

References

External links
 Live Apocalypse at Encyclopaedia Metallum
 Live Apocalypse trailer at Century Media
 Live Apocalypse Ecard at Century Media

Arch Enemy albums
2006 video albums
2006 live albums
Live video albums
Century Media Records live albums
Century Media Records video albums